Peter Prescott may refer to:

 Peter Prescott (musician) (born 1957), American drummer from Boston
 Peter Prescott (barrister) (born 1943), English barrister, Queen's Counsel and Deputy High Court Judge
 Peter S. Prescott (died 2004), American author, book reviewer, and critic